Release Me is the fourth studio album by American gospel singer Micah, released in 2010.

Track listing

Chart performance
Release Me peaked at #3 on the Billboard Top Gospel Albums chart.

References

2010 albums